Robert Pereira da Silva (born 10 April 1985) is a former Brazilian football player.

Club statistics

References

External links

1985 births
Living people
Brazilian footballers
J1 League players
Kashiwa Reysol players
Brazilian expatriate footballers
Expatriate footballers in Japan

Association football midfielders